Matesic is a surname. Notable people with the surname include:

Ed Matesic (1907–1988), American football player
Joe Matesic (born 1929), American football player